Ōba, Oba, Ooba or Ohba (written: ,  or ) is a Japanese surname. Notable people with the surname include:

 , Japanese footballer
, Japanese table tennis player
 , Japanese aikidoka and judoka
 , Japanese samurai
 , Japanese footballer
 , Japanese actor
 , Japanese voice actor and narrator
 , Japanese boxer
 , Japanese singer and actress
 , Japanese writer and social critic
 , Japanese figure skater
 , Japanese video game designer
 , Japanese submarine commander
 , Imperial Japanese Army officer
 , Japanese basketball player and executive
 , Japanese maki-e lacquer artist
 , Japanese baseball player
 , Japanese manga artist

Japanese-language surnames